The  Gadar River rises in the Iranian Zagros Mountains near the point where the borders of Iran, Turkey and Iraq meet. From its source, the river flows towards the southeast and then changes course due east through the Ushnu-Solduz valley. After leaving the valley, the river turns north and flows into marshes bordering Lake Urmia. The Ushnu-Solduz valley has been occupied for many millennia, as testified by the excavations at sites like Hasanlu Tepe and Hajji Firuz Tepe.

Notes

References

Rivers of West Azerbaijan Province
Landforms of West Azerbaijan Province
Iranian Kurdistan